A Lost Lady is a 1923 novel by American writer Willa Cather. It tells the story of Marian Forrester and her husband, Captain Daniel Forrester, who live in the Western town of Sweet Water along the Transcontinental Railroad. Throughout the story, Marian—a wealthy married socialite—is pursued by a variety of suitors and her social decline mirrors the end of the American frontier. The work had a significant influence on F. Scott Fitzgerald's 1925 novel, The Great Gatsby.

Plot summary 
Niel Herbert, a young man who grows up in Sweet Water, witnesses the slow decline of Marian Forrester, for whom he feels very deeply, and also of the West itself from the idealized age of noble pioneers to the age of capitalist exploitation.

Major characters 
 Niel Herbertthe main character who meets Mrs. Forrester as a young boy. He falls in love with what she represents and struggles to preserve his boyhood image of her. After watching her first have an affair with Frank Ellinger and later Ivy Peters, he finally leaves Sweet Water. Niel realizes by the end of the novel that his love of Marian was based on Captain Forrester's idealization of her.
 Mrs. Marian Forrestera charming socialite and the wife of Captain Forrester. Niel falls in love with what she represents, and is dismayed to discover her affair with Frank Ellinger. After her husband's death, she becomes the mistress of Ivy Peters who runs her estate. She eventually leaves the town and moves to California, dying before Niel ever sees her again.
 Captain Daniel Forresteran aging man of the Pioneer generation who made his fortune building track for the railroads in the old  days. He is proud of his beautiful wife. The novel opens at a time when he has already been physically destroyed by a fall from a horse. After suffering two strokes he eventually dies, signifying the end of the pioneering era.
 Frank Ellingera muscular bachelor and businessman of the Gilded Age generation. Frank is Mrs. Forrester's lover and visits her when the Captain is away from the house. He marries Constance Ogden.
 Ivy Petersa cocky and pretentious older boy of the Jazz Age generation who later becomes a lawyer. He becomes very wealthy and eventually succeeds in owning the Forrester estate.
 Constance Ogdenan envious Southern girl who is Niel's age and who is envious of Marian's beauty. She later marries Frank Ellinger.
 Judge PommeroyNiel's uncle, he is a lawyer that falls on hard times much the way the Forresters do.

Literary significance and criticism 

The novel has a robust symbolic framework. Critical approaches have noted that the character of Marian Forrester symbolically embodies both the American Dream, as well as the gradual decline of the American West.

Legacy and influence 
The novel had an acknowledged influence on writer F. Scott Fitzgerald who borrowed many of its themes and elements. Marian Forrester, in particular, partly inspired his Daisy Buchanan character in The Great Gatsby. Fitzgerald later wrote a letter to Cather apologizing for any unintentional plagiarism.

Media adaptations 
The first film version of the novel was created in 1924, adapted by Dorothy Farnum. Directed by Harry Beaumont, the film starred Irene Rich, Matt Moore, June Marlowe, and John Roche. It would also be adapted very loosely into a film of the same name in 1934 by Gene Markey, and starred Barbara Stanwyck as Marian Forrester. The film did not live up to the novel's reputation and is generally regarded as mediocre. Cather was so displeased with the film that she forbade any further film or stage adaptations of her work.

References

Citations

Works cited

External links 
 
 
 
 A Lost Lady at the IMDB

1923 American novels
Novels by Willa Cather
Alfred A. Knopf books
American novels adapted into films
Third-person narrative novels